Romeo Sukhlian (born 1989) is an Indian professional football player. He has most recently played for Shillong Lajong FC in the I-League as a midfielder.

External links
 http://goal.com/en-india/people/india/27043/romeo-sukhlain
 http://www.indianfootball.com/en/statistic/player/detail/playerId/671

Indian footballers
1989 births
Living people
Footballers from Nagaland
Association football midfielders
Shillong Lajong FC players